Margret Marri is a footballer from Burma who currently plays as a forward.

International goals

See also
List of Myanmar women's international footballers

External links 
 

Living people
Burmese women's footballers
Myanmar women's international footballers
Women's association football forwards
Southeast Asian Games bronze medalists for Myanmar
Southeast Asian Games medalists in football
Year of birth missing (living people)
Competitors at the 2007 Southeast Asian Games